Harpachne schimperi is a species of grass in the true grass family (Poaceae), found from Ethiopia and Sudan south to Zambia. It grows in dense tufts up to 40 cm high, with oblong panicles 4–7.5 cm long and dense spikelets.

References
 A.Rich., 1850 In: Tent. Fl. Abyss. 2: 431
 JSTOR entry
 Flora of Zimbabwe entry

Chloridoideae
Bunchgrasses of Africa